Sir Adolphus Oughton, 1st Baronet (c. 1685 – 4 September 1736), of Tachbrook, Warwickshire, was a British Army officer and politician.

Oughton was the son of Adolphus Oughton and Mary Samwell, daughter of Richard Samwell, of Upton, Northamptonshire. and educated at Trinity College, Oxford and the Middle Temple (1703).

He joined the British Army and was a captain and lieutenant-colonel in the 1st Foot Guards (1706), a 1st major and colonel in the Coldstream Guards (1715) and a lieutenant-colonel (1717) in the 8th Dragoons, of which regiment he assumed the colonelcy in 1733. He was promoted brigadier-general in 1735. He was Groom of the Bedchamber to the Prince of Wales from 1714 to 1717.

He sat as Member of Parliament for Coventry between 1715 and 1736. In 1718 he was created a baronet, of Tetchbrook in the County of Warwick.

He died in September 1736. He had first married his cousin, Frances Wagstaffe, daughter and heir of Sir Thomas Wagstaffe and the widow of Sir Edward Bagot, 4th Baronet, M.P., of Blithfield, Staffordshire. He secondly married Elizabeth, the daughter of John Baber of Sunninghill, Berkshire. He had no legitimate children and thus the baronetcy became extinct, although he did however leave an illegitimate son, James Adolphus Dickenson Oughton, who became a lieutenant-general in the British Army.

References

1736 deaths
Alumni of Trinity College, Oxford
Members of the Middle Temple
Baronets in the Baronetage of Great Britain
Year of birth uncertain
British Army generals
Members of the Parliament of Great Britain for English constituencies
British MPs 1715–1722
British MPs 1722–1727
British MPs 1727–1734
British MPs 1734–1741
Freemasons of the Premier Grand Lodge of England
Members of Parliament for Coventry
Grenadier Guards officers
Coldstream Guards officers
8th King's Royal Irish Hussars officers